Hasan Kandi may refer to various places in Iran:
 Hasan Kandi, Ardabil
 Hasan Kandi Kuh, East Azerbaijan Province
 Hasan Kandi Rud, East Azerbaijan Province
 Hasan Kandi, Chaldoran, West Azerbaijan Province
 Hasan Kandi, Miandoab, West Azerbaijan Province
 Hasan Kandi, Poldasht, West Azerbaijan Province
 Hasan Kandi, Showt, West Azerbaijan Province